Miss Spider's Sunny Patch Kids is a 2003 Canadian computer-animated television special from Nelvana and the pilot to the show Miss Spider's Sunny Patch Friends. It aired on Teletoon in Canada and Nick Jr. in the United States on March 31, 2003, and it was based on David Kirk's book series of the same name, the special features famous celebrity voices including Brooke Shields as the voice of Miss Spider, Rick Moranis as the voice of Holley, and Tony Jay as the voice of Spiderus Reeves.

The characters were "CGI animated insects and arachnids in a relatively natural setting which has a similar plot with anthropomorphic qualities appropriate for a children's story", as described by the Nelvana executives.

Plot
Miss Flora Spider has been living happily with her new husband Holley, but becomes nervous when she hatches five eggs on the same day. She worries about becoming a mother. Ever since her own mother abandoned her when she hatched. But her adoptive mother, Betty Beetle, tells her that she has nothing to worry about. When the eggs hatch out five new spiders, the family becomes overjoyed.

Years pass and as the spider kids grow up, the family  finds an egg and decorate it. Thinking its mother is looking for it, Squirt, one of the spiderlings, decides to return it. While going through the forest, he comes upon three kid orphans: Dragon the Dragonfly, Shimmer the Jewel Beetle, and Bounce the Bedbug. When the young spider explains that he is looking for his mother, Bounce reveals that they do not have parents either, although Dragon says that they are still looking for them. Shimmer decides that they should tag along and help Squirt.

Suddenly, Spiderus, a grumpy and vicious giant white spider who was jealous after Miss Spider chose Holley over him, arrives and tries to take the egg. The kids manage to scare him away. Meanwhile, Miss Spider has discovered that Squirt is missing and fears for the worst. She and Holley decide to search for him. With the help of Spiderus, who now agrees to help in the rescue mission, Miss Spider and Holley now know where Squirt is.

Snow starts to fall, and kids find Stinky, a stink bug, in his home. They take shelter there until morning. By the time the kids leave, the three adult spiders arrive. Spiderus meets and falls in love with a female spider named Spindella. The kids arrive at a barn, where a hen, revealed to be the mother of the egg, attacks. Just as Squirt is about be eaten, Miss Spider and Holley arrive and save him.

The egg hatches and is reunited with its mother. Squirt introduces his new friends to his parents. Miss Spider decides to adopt them, since eight is a perfect number. They are all overjoyed and return home. As all the kids sleep, Miss Spider understands that it does not matter what other bugs are, all that matters is that they are all family.

Squirt is eventually thought to be missing again, but he is soon found outside, flying on his web. The other kids wake up and run outside and play. As the adults look outside, they all join in the fun as they shout out "Bugs Away!"

Voice cast

See also

List of animated feature films
List of computer-animated films
List of children's films

References

External links

Official site at MGM

Scholastic site for author David Kirk
Miss Spider's Sunny Patch Kids website on Treehouse TV

2003 computer-animated films
2003 television films
2003 films
2003 television specials
2000s animated television specials
Canadian television specials
Teletoon original programming
Animated films based on children's books
Animated films about insects
Nelvana television specials
Films about spiders
Metro-Goldwyn-Mayer animated films
Films scored by Jeff Danna
Canadian television series premieres
Works about families
2003 in Canadian television
2000s American films
2000s Canadian films